Züleyxa "Zuzu" Izmailova (born 13 June 1985) is an Estonian journalist, environmental activist and politician, who was the leader of the Estonian Greens from March 2017 to February 2022.

Biography
Izmailova was born to an Azerbaijani father and Estonian mother. Her partner is fellow member of the Estonian Greens Board Joonas Laks, with whom she has two children. Izmailova studied geodesy at Kehtna Vocational Education Center from 2005 to 2008, but did not graduate.

Political career
From 2005 to 2012, she was a member of the Social Democratic Party. On 27 March 2017, Izmailova was elected as the leader of the Estonian Greens party. She was one of the candidates for the mayoralty of Tallinn in 2017. On 9 November 2017, she became one of the deputy mayors of Tallinn, with Taavi Aas as the mayor of Tallinn. She is also a noted environmental activist, staging several protests about the environmental concerns of the Rail Baltica project, as well as advocating for the strengthening of environmental regulations in Estonia.

Züleyxa Izmailova left the Estonian Greens in February 2022 and in May 2022 announced she had joined Eesti 200.

Awards
 2016 – Anne & Stiil magazine Woman of the Year

References

1985 births
Living people
Estonian people of Azerbaijani descent
Estonian journalists
Estonian women journalists
Estonian Greens politicians
21st-century Estonian politicians
Politicians from Tallinn
21st-century Estonian women politicians